Zakaria al-Agha (born 1942) (Arabic:زكريا الاغا) also known as Abu Ammar is a former member of Fatah's central committee and Palestine Liberation Organization-Executive Committee and the leader of Fatah in Gaza Strip.

Biography
Al-Agha was born in Khan Yunis in 1942. He received his Bachelor of Medicine and Surgery, from Cairo University, in 1965. In 1971 he received a specialization in internal medicine. He was Chief of inner diseases Section in Nasser Hospital in Khan Yunis 1974-1987. He was then Chief of inner diseases Section in Ahli Hospital in Gaza 1989-1994.

Union work
Founding member of the Arab Medical Society of the Gaza Strip 1977.
Treasurer of the Medical Association of Arab 1978-1984.
Chairman of the General Medical Arabia 1985-1992.
Secretary General of the Council for Higher Education in Jerusalem 1985-1992.
Association member Blood Bank, Gaza since its inception until now.
Member of the Palestinian Red Crescent Society.
Chairman of the Board of Trustees of Al-Azhar University 2002-2005.

Public work
A member of the Palestinian national liberation movement(Fatah) since  1967.
A member of the Fatah Central Committee since in 1992 until 2017.
Accredited of Fateh movement in the Gaza Strip since 1993-2005.
Member of the Executive Committee of the PLO 1996-until April 2018.
Take a head of the national and international relations of the PLO.
UNHCR Chief of the Palestine Liberation Organization.

Political action
A member of the Palestinian delegation tripartite axis of the former American Secretary of State James Baker's side of the late Faisal Husseini, Hanan Ashrawi 1991 (before negotiations in Madrid).
Negotiator member of the Palestinian delegation at the Madrid and Washington, 1991-1993.
First Minister of Housing in the first government formed by PNA  1994- 1995.

References

External links
elagha.net

1942 births
Living people
People from Khan Yunis Governorate
Fatah members
Cairo University alumni
Members of the Executive Committee of the Palestine Liberation Organization
Central Committee of Fatah members